The John Alexander House is a historic house in Maryville, Tennessee. It was built in 1906 for Presbyterian minister John Alexander, and designed in the Colonial Revival architectural style. It is listed on the National Register of Historic Places, and it is owned by Maryville College.

History
The two-story house was built in 1906 for Reverend John Alexander, a Presbyterian minister who graduated from Maryville College in 1887 and served on its board of directors for five decades. Alexander lived here with his wife, Jane Bancroft Smith Alexander, an English and History professor at Maryville College.

The house was acquired by Maryville College in 1925. It was saved from demolition and restored by Eldria Hurst, the campus chief of security, and his wife in 1967.

Architectural significance
The house was designed in the Colonial Revival architectural style. It has been listed on the National Register of Historic Places since July 25, 1989.

References

Houses on the National Register of Historic Places in Tennessee
National Register of Historic Places in Blount County, Tennessee
Colonial Revival architecture in Tennessee
Houses completed in 1906
Maryville College
1906 establishments in Tennessee